Young America Township may refer to:

Young America Township, Edgar County, Illinois
Young America Township, Carver County, Minnesota

See also 
Young America (disambiguation)

Township name disambiguation pages